The New International Version Inclusive Language Edition (NIVi) of the Christian Bible was an inclusive language version of the New International Version (NIV). It was published by Hodder and Stoughton (a subsidiary of Lagardere Publishing) in London in 1995; New Testament and Psalms, with the full bible following in 1996. It was only released in the United Kingdom and British Commonwealth Countries. 

In 1997, an article by World Magazine accused the NIVi of being "a feminist seduction of the evangelical church". This led to a protest in evangelical circles, led by James Dobson. A meeting led by Dobson released the Colorado Springs Guidelines, a set of guidelines on gender in Bible translation.

Despite some evangelicals coming to the defense of the NIVi, Zondervan responded by not releasing the NIVi in the United States.

One of the criticisms was that the word ‘man’ was replaced by a variety of words in a very mechanical way (‘anyone’ ‘person’ etc.) even in passages where clearly a man was indicated. This lent credibility to the criticism that this was a feminist translation with the need to strip the translation of as many occurrences as possible of the word ‘man’.

A modified edition was published in 1999. Typical of the changes was Leviticus 15:2-15, where ‘man’ was restored in the 1999 edition, as the passage clearly concerned males. Also John 17:6-26 a speech of Jesus was indented in the 1999 edition, following the indentation of similar passages in the gospel.
 
In 2002 Today's New International Version (TNIV) was published for the English speaking world as a replacement, but differing in its title with the addition of 'Today's'. This was also discontinued, with a slightly toned-down version of the TNIV being published as the New International Version in 2011.

References

1996 books
Bible translations into English
1996 in Christianity
New International Version